Agol is an area located in Kadi Taluka of Mahesana district of Gujarat, India.

References

External links
 Google Map link

Villages in Mehsana district